Henry "Harry" Cage (April 5, 1795 – December 31, 1858) was an American lawyer and politician who served one term as a U.S. Representative from Mississippi from 1833 to 1835.

Biography 
Born at Cages Bend of the Cumberland River, Sumner County, Tennessee, he moved to Wilkinson County, Mississippi, in early youth.  He studied law and was admitted to the bar and commenced practice in Woodville, Mississippi.  Harry married Catharine N. Stewart (1804–1829), the fourth child of Lieutenant Governor Duncan Stewart. He served as judge of the Supreme Court of Mississippi, from 1829 to 1832.

Congress 
Cage was elected as a Jacksonian to the Twenty-third Congress (March 4, 1833 – March 3, 1835).

Retirement and death 
He retired from the practice of law and settled on Woodlawn plantation in the parish of Terrebonne, near the town of Houma, in Louisiana.

He died while visiting in New Orleans, on December 31, 1858.  His remains were interred in the cemetery of the Stewart family in Mississippi.

See also
Harry T. Hays, his nephew
John Coffee Hays, another nephew
List of justices of the Supreme Court of Mississippi

References

1795 births
1859 deaths
Justices of the Mississippi Supreme Court
Jacksonian members of the United States House of Representatives from Mississippi
19th-century American politicians